Wiesław Kończak (born 5 October 1951) is a Polish wrestler. He competed in the men's freestyle 57 kg at the 1980 Summer Olympics.

References

1951 births
Living people
Polish male sport wrestlers
Olympic wrestlers of Poland
Wrestlers at the 1980 Summer Olympics
Sportspeople from Wrocław